Malcolm Duncan is the name of:

Malcolm Duncan (musician) (1945–2019), Scottish saxophonist
Mal Duncan, DC Comics character